The football competition at the 1993 Central American and Caribbean Games started on 20 November, although qualification took place beforehand. The games were played at Complejo Deportivo Max Sáchez at Arroyo, Puerto Rico.

Group A

Standings

Group B

Standings

Final round

Semifinals

Seventh Place

Fifth Place

Third Place

Final

References

External links
RSSSF.com - Central American and Caribbean Games 1993 (Puerto Rico)
Puerto Rico Under 23 National Football Team History

1993 Central American and Caribbean Games
1993
CEn
1993